The River Spen or Spen Beck, in West Yorkshire, England is a tributary of the River Calder. It rises north of Cleckheaton, runs through Liversedge and flows into the Calder to the south of Dewsbury at Ravensthorpe. The average rainfall for the river valley of between 600–1000mm per annum when combined with the steep narrow river channel, makes the Spen susceptible to regular flooding. It is referred to in the name of the local parliamentary constituency, Batley and Spen, to account for the villages and suburbs of Batley in the Spen Valley, such as Liversedge and Gomersal.

Course

The River Spen is formed at the confluence of Hunsworth Beck and Nann Hall Beck in Cleckheaton. The river flows south past industrial premises parallel to a dismantled railway line before turning south east on the outskirts of Liversedge. It continues south east through the industrial centre of the town before returning southwards along the edge of Heckmondwike. On the outskirts of Ravensthorpe, the river turns south east again before joining the River Calder.

Natural history

The Spen is mainly an urban waterway and has been polluted by sewage effluent and industrial waste, though levels of pollutants and mine water discharges have decreased since 1999. Heavy rain can cause pollutant levels to rise and the river suffers from tipping and urban litter.

Several non-native species of plant are found along the river including giant hogweed, Himalayan balsam and Japanese knotweed. Bistort, wild garlic, nettles and dandelions are found in abundance in the meadows between the conurbations.

Leisure

The disused railway line adjacent to the riverbank is part of the Spen Valley Greenway (National Cycle Route 66) from Dewsbury to Oakenshaw near Bradford. The greenway is home to a collection of artworks, including A Flock of Swaledale Sheep, constructed from recycled industrial scrap by Sally Matthews, and Rotate by Trudi Entwistle which comprises 40 giant steel hoops set in a circle.

Lists

Tributaries

 Finching Dike
 Canker Dyke

Settlements

 Cleckheaton
 Liversedge
 Heckmondwike
 Ravensthorpe

Crossings

 A643, Cleckheaton
 Thornton Street, Cleckheaton
 A638, Rawfolds Bridge, Cleckheaton
 Cartwright Street, Cleckheaton
 Primrose Lane, Cleckheaton
 Radulf Gardens, Liversedge
 Knowler Hill, Liversedge
 Valley Road, Liversedge

 A62, Liversedge
 A649, Wakefiled Road, Liversedge
 Wormald Street, Liversedge
 Union Street, Liversedge
 Beck Lane, Liversedge
 Smithies Bridge, Station Lane, Liversedge
 A644, Huddersfield Road, Ravensthorpe

Sources

Ordnance Survey Open Data https://www.ordnancesurvey.co.uk/business-government/tools-support/open-data-support

References

Spen